Guthrie Center is a city in Guthrie County, Iowa, United States, along the South Raccoon River. The population was 1,593 at the time of the 2020 census. It is the county seat of Guthrie County.

Guthrie Center is part of the Des Moines–West Des Moines Metropolitan Statistical Area.

History
Guthrie Center was platted in 1856. It was named for Capt. Edwin B. Guthrie. The railroad was built through the settlement in 1879. Guthrie Center was incorporated in 1880.

Geography
Guthrie Center is located at  (41.679618, -94.500812).

Climate

According to the Köppen Climate Classification system, Guthrie Center has a hot-summer humid continental climate, abbreviated "Dfa" on climate maps.

Demographics

2010 census
As of the census of 2010, there were 1,569 people, 677 households, and 387 families residing in the city. The racial makeup of the city was 96.0% White, 0.1% African American, 0.4% Native American, 0.2% Asian, 0.1% Pacific Islander, 2.2% from other races, and 0.9% from two or more races. Hispanic or Latino of any race were 3.6% of the population.

There were 677 households, of which 26.3% had children under the age of 18 living with them, 45.2% were married couples living together, 7.8% had a female householder with no husband present, 4.1% had a male householder with no wife present, and 42.8% were non-families. 38.0% of all households were made up of individuals, and 21.6% had someone living alone who was 65 years of age or older. The average household size was 2.22 and the average family size was 2.96.

The median age in the city was 44.9 years. 23.1% of residents were under the age of 18; 6.4% were between the ages of 18 and 24; 20.9% were from 25 to 44; 24% were from 45 to 64; and 25.7% were 65 years of age or older. The gender makeup of the city was 46.6% male and 53.4% female.

2000 census
As of the census of 2000, there were 1,668 people, 726 households, and 453 families residing in the city. The racial makeup of the city was 98.32% White, 0.06% African American, 0.06% Native American, 0.06% Asian, 1.02% from other races, and 0.48% from two or more races. Hispanic or Latino of any race were 1.32% of the population.

There were 726 households, out of which 27.7% had children under the age of 18 living with them, 49.9% were married couples living together, 9.0% had a female householder with no husband present, and 37.6% were non-families. 34.2% of all households were made up of individuals, and 22.2% had someone living alone who was 65 years of age or older. The average household size was 2.21 and the average family size was 2.80.

Age spread: 24.2% under the age of 18, 5.4% from 18 to 24, 22.7% from 25 to 44, 21.2% from 45 to 64, and 26.6% who were 65 years of age or older. The median age was 43 years. For every 100 females, there were 82.3 males. For every 100 females age 18 and over, there were 77.7 males.

The median income for a household in the city was $30,714, and the median income for a family was $42,308. Males had a median income of $30,446 versus $21,940 for females. The per capita income for the city was $16,662. About 6.3% of families and 7.7% of the population were below the poverty line, including 7.8% of those under age 18 and 10.7% of those age 65 or over.

Education
The Guthrie Center Community School District operates public schools:
 Guthrie Center Elementary School
 AC/GC High School

Under a grade-sharing arrangement with the Adair–Casey Community School District, students attend AC/GC Junior High School in Adair.

Notable people

James Ellison, actor
Jim Flanery, Creighton University women's basketball coach
Bridget Flanery, actress
Coleman Griffith, pioneer of sports psychology
Jack Laughery (1935–2006), CEO of Hardee's from 1975 to 1990
John Taggart, poet

References

External links

 
Guthrie Center, Iowa Portal style website, Government, Businesses, Recreation and more
City-Data Comprehensive Statistical Data and more about Guthrie Center

Cities in Iowa
Cities in Guthrie County, Iowa
County seats in Iowa
Des Moines metropolitan area
1856 establishments in Iowa
Populated places established in 1856